The Gare de Lyon, officially Paris-Gare-de-Lyon, is one of the six large mainline railway stations in Paris, France. It handles about 148.1 million passengers annually according to the estimates of the SNCF in 2018, with SNCF railways and RER D accounting for around 110 million and 38 million on the RER A, making it the second-busiest station of France after the Gare du Nord and one of the busiest in Europe.

The station is located in the 12th arrondissement, on the right bank of the river Seine, in the east of Paris. Opened in 1849, it is the northern terminus of the Paris–Marseille railway. It is named after the city of Lyon, a stop for many long-distance trains departing here, most en route to the South of France.  The station is served by high-speed TGV trains to Southern and Eastern France, Switzerland, Germany, Italy and Spain. The station also hosts regional trains and the RER and also the Gare de Lyon Métro station.

Main line trains depart from 32 platforms in two distinct halls: Hall 1, which is the older train shed, contains tracks labelled with letters from A to N, while the modern addition of Hall 2 contains tracks which are numbered from 5 to 23. There are a further four platforms for the RER underneath the main lines.

History
Lyon railway station had been under construction since 1847. It was officially opened to the public on 12 August 1849 under the name "Railway station from Paris to Montereau" (fr. Embarcadère de chemin de fer de Paris à Montereau). It was a boardwalk building designed by architect François-Alexis Cendrier under the direction of Baron Haussmann, and at the time of its construction it was awaiting arbitration between the French state and the first Compagnie des chemins de fer de Paris à Lyon et à la Méditerranée (PLM) company over its management. PLM did not like the fact that Mazas prison was being built next to the station. The company hoped that it could extend the railroad branch line to Place de la Bastille. But instead of that, Lyon Street (fr. Rue de Lyon) was laid out between the station and Place de la Bastille. The station was expanded many times as the volume of rail traffic increased.

As the station became unsuitable for further expansion, a second Gare de Lyon building was constructed in 1855 by the design of the architect François-Alexis Cendrier. New building was operated by the newly established Paris à Lyon (PL) railway company. The station was built on a six- to eight-meter high embankment to protect it from the floods of the Seine. It had only five tracks, occupying a large hall 220 meters long and 42 meters wide. A portico to the right of the entrance to the arrival hall connected the station itself to the Bâtiment X, the central administration building on the side facing Boulevard Mazas. The station was partially destroyed by fire during the Paris Commune in 1871 and later rebuilt.

On 8 July 1887, General Georges Boulanger's departure from Paris triggered a demonstration: 8,000 people stormed the train station and covered the train with "Il reviendra" (He will return) posters and delayed its departure by an hour and a half.

By 1900, in time for the 1900 World's Fair, a new thirteen-track Gare de Lyon building was constructed, designed by the Toulon architect Marius Toudoire and decorated with a large fresco by the Marseille artist Jean-Baptiste Olive, depicting some of the cities to which one could take a train from this station. It was inaugurated on 6 April 1901 by Émile Loubet, president of the Third Republic.

On multiple levels, it is considered a classic example of the architecture of its time. Most notable is the large clock tower atop one corner of the station, similar in style to the clock tower of the Palace of Westminster, home to Big Ben. The station houses the Le Train Bleu restaurant, which has served drinks and meals to travellers and other guests since 1901 in an ornately decorated setting.

On 27 June 1988, in the Gare de Lyon train accident, a runaway train crashed into a stationary rush-hour train, killing 56 people and injuring a further 55. A fire broke out on 28 February 2020, that was reportedly started by Congolese protesters. The station was completely evacuated.

Train services
From Gare de Lyon train services depart to major French cities such as: Lyon, Marseille, Nice, Montpellier, Perpignan, Dijon, Besançon, Mulhouse, Grenoble and a number of destinations in the French Alps. International services operate to Italy: Turin and Milan; Switzerland: Geneva, Zürich, Basel and Lausanne; and Spain: Barcelona.

The following services currently call at Gare de Lyon:

High speed services (TGV)
Paris–Lyon
Paris–Avignon–Marseille
Paris–Avignon–Toulon–Cannes–Nice
Paris–Lyon–Montpellier–Béziers–Narbonne–Perpignan
Paris–Lyon–Montpellier–Perpignan–Girona–Barcelona
Paris–Grenoble
Paris–Bellegarde–Annemasse–Evian-les-Bains
Paris–Lyon–Chambéry–Turin–Milan
Paris–Chambéry–Aix-les-Bains–Annecy
Paris–Dijon–Besançon–Belfort–Mulhouse
Paris–Dijon–Besançon-Viotte
Paris–Dijon–Chalon-sur-Saône
Paris–Lyon–Saint-Étienne
Paris–Valence–Avignon–Miramas
Paris–Chambéry–Albertville–Bourg-Saint-Maurice (winter)
High speed services (Frecciarossa) 
Paris–Lyon–Chambéry–Turin–Milan
Paris-Lyon-Part-Dieu-Lyon-Perrache
High speed services (TGV Lyria)
Paris–Bellegarde–Geneva (–Lausanne)
Paris–Belfort–Mulhouse–Basel (–Zurich)
Paris–Dijon–Lausanne
Regional services Paris–Montereau–Sens–Laroche-Migennes
Regional services (Transilien) Paris–Melun–Moret–Nemours–Montargis
Paris RER services A
Saint-Germain-en-Laye–Nanterre-Universite–La Defense–Gare de Lyon–Vincennes–Boissy-Saint-Leger
Cergy le Haut–Conflans–Sartrouville–La Defense–Gare de Lyon–Vincennes–Val-de-Fontenay–Marne-la-Vallee (Disneyland)
Poissy–Sartrouville–La Defense–Gare de Lyon–Vincennes–Val-de-Fontenay–Marne-la-Vallee (Disneyland)
Paris RER services D
Creil–Orry-la-Ville–Goussainville–Saint Denis–Gare du Nord–Gare de Lyon–Combs-la-Ville–Melun
Goussainville–Saint Denis–Gare du Nord–Gare de Lyon–Juvisy–Ris–Corbeil
Châtelet–Gare de Lyon–Juvisy–Grigny–Corbeil–Malesherbes
Gare de Lyon–Juvisy–Grigny–Corbeil–Melun

In films
The station has appeared in the following films: 
 1972: Travels with My Aunt, directed by George Cukor
 1998: L'étudiante, Starring Sophie Marceau
 2005: The Mystery of the Blue Train, an Hercule Poirot mystery novel by Agatha Christie (and its TV adaptation)
 2007: Mr. Bean's Holiday, directed by Steve Bendelack
 2010: The Tourist, directed by Florian Henckel von Donnersmarck

See also
List of Paris railway stations
 List of stations of the Paris RER
 List of stations of the Paris Métro
 Gare de Lyon rail accident

References

External links

 
 
Intercity and TGV schedules from SNCF

Réseau Express Régional stations
Railway termini in Paris
Buildings and structures in the 12th arrondissement of Paris
Railway stations in France opened in 1847
Railway stations located underground in France